Beeramguda is a town located in Sangareddy district in Telangana. It is famous for its Bhramarambhika Mallikharjuna Swamy Mandir which is located on a small hill nearby called Beeramguda Gutta.

About

Beeramguda is well connected by bus: Beeramguda Bus stop is located near Beeramguda Kaman. The nearest railway stations are Rama chandra puram (shortcut of it is R.C.Puram),lingampally and Chanda nagar and the nearest metro station is Miyapur metro station and the nearest airports are Begumpet airport and RGIA Shamshabad.

Beeramguda has seen unprecedented growth in real estate in the past few years. Many new ventures from various companies such as Praneeth - Pranav and Navya Developers have arisen in the area. This is due to the satisfactory proximity to the IT Hub of Hyderabad- Gachibowli and HITEC - City, and also relatively lower cost of living.

Beeramguda also has a lake, commonly known as Beeramguda Lake. Beautification efforts have been taken by the Government, and a statue of Chakali Ilamma was also unveiled in 2018. It also is surrounded by typical Hyderabad hinterland - Boulders and rocks surrounded by bush forests and Grasslands, where peacocks are a relatively common sight.

The village comes under the Ameenpur Municipality, in the state of Telangana, and is located in the Sangareddy District.

There are many well known schools such as Genesis international school,Delhi public world school, rainbow international School etc.

Tourist places
Bhramarambha Mallikarjuna Swamy Temple, Venkateshwara Swamy Temple, Venu Gopala Swamy Temple are all temples located in the village. The first mentioned temple is famous for and well visited during its Shivaratri celebrations in early parts of each year. The temple complex is big with Lord Shiva being the main deity, temples for  Lord Parvathi,  Lord Ganesha and Lord Kumaraswamy are also located in the complex.

Neighbourhoods
Patancheru, Serilingampally and Chandanagar are the nearest towns to Beeramguda. Nearest villages include Kistareddypet, Isnapur, Sultanpur etc. It is bordered by Ashok Nagar, Kakatiya Nagar, Bhavanipuram, Shiridi Sai Colony, Kistareddypet and Ramachandra Reddy Colony.

External links
 Welcome to Beeramguda

References

Medak district